Mattock Rangers Gaelic Athletic Association is a Gaelic football, camogie, hurling and ladies' Gaelic football club based in Collon, County Louth, Republic of Ireland.[1][2][3][4]

History
The club was founded in 1952 and is named after the Mattock River, a tributary of the Boyne. 

They won a Louth Junior Football Championship county football title in 1961 and a Louth Intermediate Football Championship title in 1982. Mattock lost their first four Louth Senior Football Championship finals, in 1973, 1976, 1962 and 2001. Senior success finally came in 2002; in that year, Mattock Rangers reached the final of the Leinster Senior Club Football Championship, losing to Dunshaughlin. They have won three more senior titles since then.

The hurlers have never been county champions, but reached the final of the Louth Senior Hurling Championship in 2011.

Honours

Gaelic football
 Leinster Intermediate Club Football Championship: Winners (1) 2019
 Louth Senior Football Championship (4): 2002, 2004, 2009, 2010
 Louth Intermediate Football Championship (1): 1982, 2019
 Louth Junior Football Championship (1): 1961

References

External links
Official website

Gaelic games clubs in County Louth
Gaelic football clubs in County Louth